Archezoa was a kingdom proposed in the 20th century by Thomas Cavalier-Smith (1942–2021), and was believed to encompass eukaryotes which did not have mitochondria (and are therefore amitochondriate) or peroxisomes (e.g. Giardia). The category was dropped after it was discovered that all the amitochondriates were descendants of eukaryotes with mitochondria that had lost them.

History

Origin
This taxonomic category was proposed upon the discovery that some protists lacked mitochondria, which suggested to Cavalier-Smith that the initial ancestor of eukaryotes emerged prior to the endosymbiosis of mitochondria (cf. Giardia).

Eukaryotes that eventually acquired a bacterial endosymbiont that became the mitochondria were placed in a taxonomic group which Cavalier-Smith called the Metakaryota, whereas the Archezoa represented a paraphyletic group involving four phyla representing primitive eukaryotes which evolved prior to the acquisition of mitochondria. Organisms making up the Archezoa are species of amitochondriate protists and some fungi, whereas Cavalier-Smith categorized mitochondriate protists within a group he termed the Mitozoa. Included in the Archezoa are Microsporidia, Metamonada, and Parabasalids.

Original mitochondria lost
In light of discoveries which took place not long after this taxonomic category was proposed, the validity of this category could not be maintained: Eukaryotic protists lacking mitochondria were discovered to have experienced secondary mitochondrial loss, meaning that their ancestors once possessed mitochondria but that these mitochondria had, over time, been lost or reduced. In some of these organisms, mitochondria had degraded into simpler double-membrane bound organelles known as mitosomes and hydrogenosomes. Some of both types of organelles are known to have fully lost their genome.

Initial discoveries found that amitochondriate organisms appeared to express mitochondrial Hsp60 and Hsp70 proteins from the nuclear DNA of the organism. This indicated that the ancestors of these organisms once possessed mitochondria which expressed these proteins, but that these genes had migrated to their nuclear DNA over time as a result of endosymbiotic gene transfer.

As a result, it could not be said that there are any eukaryotes lacking mitochondria which had emerged from an earlier part of the eukaryotic lineage that preceded the acquisition of mitochondria.

Long branch attraction
Another supporting evidence for the Archezoa group was that amitochondriate protists appeared to branch off early on from the eukaryotic lineage in phylogenetic analyses, supporting the supposition that Archezoa were more closely linked to primitive eukaryotes that evolved prior to the endosymbiosis event that generated the mitochondria. However, this early divergence later turned out to be a type of systematic error that is possible in phylogenetic analysis called "long branch attraction".

References 

Obsolete eukaryote taxa
Biological hypotheses
Mitochondria
Kingdoms (biology)